Jernej Papež (born 13 January 1994) is a Slovenian footballer who plays as a winger.

References

External links
NZS profile 

1994 births
Living people
Footballers from Ljubljana
Slovenian footballers
Association football wingers
NK Domžale players
NK Radomlje players
NK Triglav Kranj players
NK Ankaran players
NK Dob players
Slovenia youth international footballers
Slovenian PrvaLiga players